Hatam may refer to:

 Hatam language, a language of West Papua
 Khalifeh Kandi, Hashtrud, also known as Hātam, a village in Iran
 Iraj Hatam, Iranian football player

See also 
 
 Khatam